Retraced is the second studio album released by American rock guitarist Jake E. Lee. The album features no original material, instead consisting of covers of various bands from Lee's youth.

For the recording of Retraced, Lee recruited former Michael Schenker Group frontman Chris Logan, Tim Bogert of Vanilla Fudge, Cactus and Beck, Bogert & Appice fame, and Aynsley Dunbar, formerly of Journey, Frank Zappa's Mothers of Invention, David Bowie's backing band and Whitesnake.

Track listing

Personnel
Jake E. Lee - guitars, production
Chris Logan - vocals
Tim Bogert - bass
Aynsley Dunbar - drums, percussion

Additional personnel
Mike Varney - production
Michael Lardie - production, engineering
Tim Gennert - mastering
Dave Stephens - cover artwork design
Kelly Garni - photography

References

Jake E. Lee albums
2005 albums
Albums produced by Mike Varney
Covers albums